Glenea pici is a species of beetle in the family Cerambycidae. It was described by Per Olof Christopher Aurivillius in 1925. It is known from Vietnam, India and Laos.

Subspecies
 Glenea pici pici Aurivillius, 1925
 Glenea pici schmidi Breuning, 1967

References

pici
Beetles described in 1925